Prionotus is a genus of marine ray-finned fishes belonging to the family Triglidae, one of two genera belonging to the subfamily Prionotinae, the searobins. These fishes are found in the Western Atlantic Ocean and eastern Pacific Ocean, in the waters off both North and South America.

Taxonomy
Prionotus was first described as a genus in 1801 by the French naturalist Bernard Germain de Lacépède, Lacépède described it as a monotypic genus with Trigla evolans, described by Linnaeus in 1766, as its type species.The genus is one of 2 genera classified within the subfamily Prionotinae, the searobins, in the gurnard family Triglidae. The genus name is a compound of prion, “saw”, and notus, “back”, as Lacépède saw three free dorsal spines when he was describing the type species P. evolans but these were probably the result of damage to the specimen.

Species

There are currently 23 recognized species in this genus:
 Prionotus alatus Goode & T. H. Bean, 1883 (Spiny searobin)
 Prionotus albirostris D. S. Jordan & Bollman, 1890 (Whitesnout searobin)
 Prionotus beanii Goode, 1896 (Bean's searobin)
 Prionotus birostratus J. Richardson, 1844 (Two-beaked searobin)
 Prionotus carolinus (Linnaeus, 1771) (Northern searobin)
 Prionotus evolans (Linnaeus, 1766) (Striped searobin)
 Prionotus horrens J. Richardson, 1844 (Bristly searobin)
 Prionotus longispinosus Teague, 1951 (Bigeye searobin)
 Prionotus martis Ginsburg, 1950 (Gulf of Mexico barred searobin)
 Prionotus miles Jenyns, 1840 (Galapagos gurnard)
 Prionotus murielae Mowbray, 1928
 Prionotus nudigula Ginsburg, 1950 (Red searobin)
 Prionotus ophryas D. S. Jordan & Swain, 1885 (Bandtail searobin)
 Prionotus paralatus Ginsburg, 1950 (Mexican searobin)
 Prionotus punctatus (Bloch, 1793) (Bluewing searobin)
 Prionotus roseus D. S. Jordan & Evermann, 1887 (Bluespotted searobin)
 Prionotus rubio D. S. Jordan, 1886 (Blackwing searobin)
 Prionotus ruscarius Gilbert & Starks, 1904 (Common searobin)
 Prionotus scitulus D. S. Jordan & Gilbert, 1882 (Leopard searobin)
 Prionotus stearnsi D. S. Jordan & Swain, 1885 (Shortwing searobin)
 Prionotus stephanophrys Lockington, 1881 (Lumptail searobin)
 Prionotus teaguei Briggs, 1956 (Long-ray searobin)
 Prionotus tribulus G. Cuvier, 1829 (Bighead searobin)

P. murielae is based on a single holotype and in 2020 it was proposed that this was a juvenile of P. ophyras, and this taxon is treated as a junior synonym of P. ophryas.

Characteristics
Prionotus searobins have a large, nearly square head, Bonny head which bears a number of spines and ridges with a wide inter orbital space. The mouth is either terminal or slightly inferior with simple teeth on the jaws and on the roof of the mouth. There are 2 separate dorsal fins, the first with normally 10, sometimes 9 or 11, spines, although the very short rear spines are very difficult to discern. The second dorsal fin has 11 to 13 soft rays. The long pectoral fins extend beyond the middle of the base of the anal fin and contains, 13-14 rays within its membrane and 2-3 enlarged, rays at the bottom of the fin that are free from its membrane. Most of the body is covered in rough scales including the upper rear flap of the operculum over the spine with scales and the nape.

Distribution and habitat
Prionotus sea robins are found in the tropical and temperate waters of the Eastern Pacific Ocean and Western Pacific Ocean off both North and South America. These benthic fishes occur in inshore waters, bays, and estuaries. Fossils of Prionotus have been found in England and along the Atlantic Cast of the United States from Florida to New Jersey.

Biology
Prionotus are able to create grunting vocalisations by vibrating the swim bladder with certain muscles, this sounds like the croaking of a frog and has is the origin of the alternative common name of gurnard, derived from a French word meaning, “to grunt”. These fishes are less active in the daylight hours and are mostly nocturnal, using their enlarged separate pectoral fin rays to walk along the substrate and detect prey buries in the sand or mud. These rays can manipulate objects and detect prey using chemoreception , The bony, square head can be used to excavate small prey items from the substrate and their rather catholic diet includes crustaceans, cephalopods, gastropods, bivalves, amphipods, eggs, other fish and seaweed, juveniles eat more copepods. Their sharp spines seem to deter most predators but they are preyed on by some sharks.

When they are mating they are known to make a staccato call, different from their typical grunts. They spawn between late spring and early fall, with activity peaking in July and August. They are batch spawners, the females have a few ripe eggs at a time and these are fertilized externally. The pelagic eggs are yellow, and have a diameter of less than 1 millimeter. They take around 60 hours to hatch and there is no parental care.

See also
 List of prehistoric bony fish
 Sea robin

References

External links

 
Prionotinae
Marine fish genera
Taxa named by Bernard Germain de Lacépède